The large-eared ground skink  (Scincella macrotis) is a species of skink found in the Nicobar Islands of India.

References

 Boulenger, G. A. 1887 Catalogue of the Lizards in the British Museum (Nat. Hist.) III. Lacertidae, Gerrhosauridae, Scincidae, Anelytropsidae, Dibamidae, Chamaeleontidae. London: 575pp.
 Steindachner, F. 1867 In: Reise der Österreichischen Fregatte Novara um die Erde in den Jahren 1857, 1858,1859 unter den Befehlen des Commodore B. von Wüllerstorf-Urbair (Zoologie), Vol. 1, part 3 (Reptilien p. 1-98). K. Gerold's Sohn/Kaiserlich-Königl. Hof- und Staatsdruckerei, Wien [1869 on title page]

Scincella
Reptiles of India
Endemic fauna of the Nicobar Islands
Reptiles described in 1867
Taxa named by Franz Steindachner